
nnn (shortened as n³) is a free and open-source file manager which provides a text-based user interface to provide file managing functionalities for Unix-like systems. It is a fork of noice. nnn has several additional features to provide a more complete file managing experience. Its goal is to provide file managing operations while using a minimal memory footprint and very optimized performance, as it uses low-level functions to access the file system and keeps the number of reads to a minimum, allowing it to perform well on embedded devices. As the base program follows a minimal design philosophy, additional features and functionality are available via user plugins.

Operation 
Each instance of nnn provides 4 contexts, or commonly referred to as tabs, which allow you to browse multiple directories within the same instance. From within nnn basic file operations such as adding, duplicating, moving, removing and renaming files are available. Additionally it provides functionally for mass file renaming and mounting remote drives via sshfs. One unique feature is that separate instances of nnn can share the selection that has been made in one of the running instances.

Browsing through the file structure can be done with keys or mouse, in larger directories it is recommended to filter out the results via a text search string or regular expression.

Configuration 
nnn retains most of its configuration to environment variables or command line arguments. Additional functionality can be installed via plugins that can be activated via an extra menu or adding keybindings for them.

See also 

 Comparison of file managers
 ranger, a file manager based on ncurses and Python
 Midnight Commander, an older ncurses-based file manager

References

External links 

Article on Arch Linux wiki
Showcase of nnn
Noice git repository

Free software programmed in C
Free file managers
Software that uses ncurses
Console applications
Linux software